Drychateres bilineatus is a species of beetle in the family Cerambycidae, the only species in the genus Drychateres.

References

Trachyderini
Monotypic Cerambycidae genera